Henry Julian White (27 August 1859 – 16 July 1934) was an English biblical scholar.

White was born in Islington, north London, the second son of Henry John White. He was educated at Christ Church, Oxford, matriculating on 11 October 1878, graduating B.A. in 1882 (M.A. 1885). He was ordained in 1886, becoming the domestic chaplain of John Wordsworth in the same year. He was Chaplain and a Fellow of Merton College, Oxford, where he taught theology, from 1895 to 1905; and a Fellow of King's College London from 1905 to 1920. He assisted Wordsworth in producing an edition of the Vulgate Bible. He was also co-author of A Grammar of the Vulgate. He was Dean of Christ Church in Oxford from 1920 to 1934.

White supported the appointment of Albert Einstein as a Student (Fellow) at Christ Church, despite opposition by J. G. C. Anderson on nationalistic and perhaps even xenophobic (according to White) grounds in the early 1930s.

References

Further reading 

 

1859 births
1934 deaths
People from Islington (district)
Alumni of Christ Church, Oxford
British biblical scholars
English Anglicans
Academics of the University of Oxford
Academics of King's College London
Deans of Christ Church, Oxford
Anglican biblical scholars
Fellows of Merton College, Oxford